Bethan Raggatt (born 10 September 1966) is a British sailor. She competed in the women's 470 event at the 1996 Summer Olympics.

References

External links
 
 

1966 births
Living people
British female sailors (sport)
Olympic sailors of Great Britain
Sailors at the 1996 Summer Olympics – 470
Sportspeople from London